Garhi Fateh Khan is a village in Shaheed Bhagat Singh Nagar district of Punjab State, India. The village is administrated by Sarpanch an elected representative of the village.

Demography 
As of 2011, Garhi Fateh Khan has a total number of 170 houses and population of 887 of which 467 include are males while 420 are females according to the report published by Census India in 2011. The literacy rate of Garhi Fateh Khan is 82.38%, higher than the state average of 75.84%. The population of children under the age of 6 years is 121 which is 13.64% of total population of Garhi Fateh Khan, and child sex ratio is approximately 1161 as compared to Punjab state average of 846.

Most of the people are from Schedule Caste which constitutes 45.89% of total population in Garhi Fateh Khan. The town does not have any Schedule Tribe population so far.

As per the report published by Census India in 2011, 261 people were engaged in work activities out of the total population of Garhi Fateh Khan which includes 239 males and 22 females. According to census survey report 2011, 98.85% workers describe their work as main work and 1.15% workers are involved in Marginal activity providing livelihood for less than 6 months.

Education 
The village has a Punjabi medium, co-ed upper primary school founded in 1981. The schools does not provide mid-day meal. The school provide free education to children between the ages of 6 and 14 as per Right of Children to Free and Compulsory Education Act. KC Engineering College and Doaba Khalsa Trust Group Of Institutions are the nearest colleges.

Transport 
Rahon railway station is the nearest (4.0 kilometres) train station however, Nawanshar Junction railway station is 11.7 km away from the village.

See also 
List of villages in India

References

External links 
 Tourism of Punjab
 Census of Punjab
 Locality Based PINCode

Villages in Shaheed Bhagat Singh Nagar district